Iauareté (or Iauaretê) is a small town in São Gabriel da Cachoeira Municipality, Amazonas state in Brazil. It is located near the border with Colombia.

History
Iauaretê was also a village of great importance during the most recent history of colonization in the region. Located at the confluence point of the Uaupés and Papurí rivers, sub-regions densely populated by the Tariano, Tucano, Pira-tapuya, Wanano, Arapasso, Tuyuka and other ethnic groups. It served as a point of reference for countless travelers who traveled the area since the end of the eighteenth century, for rubber tappers and merchants who exploited indigenous labor and, finally, as a base for Salesian missionaries who in 1930 implanted a great mission there dedicated to catechesisof the Indians. In five decades of operation, its boarding schools have received hundreds of indigenous students. At the end of the 1980s, an army platoon and an airstrip were built in Iauaretê, as part of a program for the defense and colonization of the North Amazonian border, the so-called Calha Norte Project.

The local population is about 3 thousand people, and the aspect of the place is that of a small town, with electricity, telephone, television, schools and commerce.

Climate
Iauaretê has a tropical rainforest climate (Af) with heavy to very heavy rainfall year-round. Of all the official weather stations in Brazil, it has the highest average annual rainfall.

References
 

Populated places in Amazonas (Brazilian state)